John Douglas (1830–1911) was an English architect based in Chester, Cheshire. His designs included new churches, alterations to and restoration of existing churches, church furnishings, new houses and alterations to existing houses.  He also designed a variety of other buildings, including shops, banks, offices, schools, memorials and public buildings.  His architectural styles were eclectic, but as he worked during the period of the Gothic Revival, much of his work incorporates elements of the English Gothic style.  Douglas is probably best remembered for his incorporation of vernacular elements in his buildings, especially half-timbering.  Of particular importance is Douglas' use of joinery and highly detailed wood carving.

Douglas was born in the Cheshire village of Sandiway and was articled to the Lancaster architect E. G. Paley, later becoming his chief assistant.  He established an office in Chester in either 1855 or 1860, from where he practised throughout his career.  Initially he ran the office himself but in 1884 he appointed a former assistant, Daniel Porter Fordham, as a partner.  When Fordham retired in 1897, he was succeeded by Charles Howard Minshull. In 1909 this partnership was dissolved and Douglas ran the office alone until his death in 1911.  As his office was in Chester, most of his work was carried out in Cheshire and North Wales, although some was further afield in regions including Merseyside, Greater Manchester, and Shropshire.

From an early stage in his career, Douglas attracted commissions from wealthy and powerful patrons, the first of which came from Hugh Cholmondeley, 2nd Baron Delamere. His most important patrons were the Grosvenor family of Eaton Hall, namely Richard Grosvenor, 2nd Marquess of Westminster, Hugh Grosvenor, 1st Duke of Westminster, and Hugh Grosvenor, 2nd Duke of Westminster. Douglas designed a large number and variety of buildings in the family's Eaton Hall estate and the surrounding villages.  Other important patrons were William Molyneux, 4th Earl of Sefton, Rowland Egerton-Warburton of Arley Hall, George Cholmondeley, 5th Marquess of Cholmondeley, and Francis Egerton, 3rd Earl of Ellesmere.  Later in his career Douglas carried out commissions for W. E. Gladstone and his family, and for W. H. Lever.

This list consists of the major, or more unusual, works carried out by Douglas, excluding his work on or related to churches or houses. It contains a great variety of buildings, including schools, shops, offices, hotels, public houses, banks, model farms, cheese factories and a gentlemen's club.  More utilitarian buildings include public baths and a public convenience.  Other commissions undertaken by Douglas included in the list include a commemorative clock, memorials, a bridge, park gates and walls, a canopy over a well, a temporary triumphal arch, and an obelisk in the drive of a stately home.  Many of these have been recognised as listed buildings. Listed buildings are divided into three grades according to their importance (see key).  The details have been taken from the Catalogue of Works in Edward Hubbard's biography.  Works attributed to Douglas by Hubbard on stylistic grounds together with evidence of a local association, even though they are not confirmed by other reliable evidence, are included.  Where this is the case, it is stated in the Notes column. Unexecuted schemes are not included.

Key

Buildings and structures

See also

List of new churches by John Douglas
List of church restorations, amendments and furniture by John Douglas
List of houses and associated buildings by John Douglas

References
Citations

Sources

External links

 Non-ecclesiastical
Douglas, John
Lists of buildings and structures in Cheshire